Joan I (1191–1205), also called Joanna of Hohenstaufen, was ruling Countess of Burgundy from 1200 to 1205. She was daughter of Otto I, Count of Burgundy, and Margaret, Countess of Blois.

Born in 1191, Joan was countess from the time of her father's assassination at Besançon in 1200 until her own death in 1205, whereupon her sister, Beatrice II, succeeded her.

References

Countesses of Burgundy
Joan
German countesses
1191 births
1205 deaths
Burgundy, Countess of, Joan I
13th-century women rulers
12th-century French people
12th-century French women
13th-century French people
13th-century French women